The 2017 Amex-Istanbul Challenger was a professional tennis tournament played on hard courts. It was the 30th edition of the tournament which was part of the 2017 ATP Challenger Tour. It took place in Istanbul, Turkey between 11 and 17 September 2017.

Singles main-draw entrants

Seeds

 1 Rankings are as of 28 August 2017.

Other entrants
The following players received wildcards into the singles main draw: 
  Altuğ Çelikbilek
  Muhammet Haylaz
  Mert Naci Türker
  Anıl Yüksel

The following players received entry from the qualifying draw:
  Robin Kern
  Yannick Mertens
  Roman Safiullin
  Marc Sieber

The following player received entry as a lucky loser:
  Shalva Dzhanashia

Champions

Singles

 Malek Jaziri def.  Matteo Berrettini 7–6(7–4), 0–6, 7–5.

Doubles

 Andre Begemann /  Jonathan Eysseric def.  Romain Arneodo /  Hugo Nys 6–3, 5–7, [10–4].

References

Amex-Istanbul Challenger
PTT İstanbul Cup
2017 in Turkish tennis